Ji-ae is a Korean feminine given name. Its meaning differs based on the hanja used to write each syllable of the name. There are 46 hanja with the reading "ji" and 14 hanja with the reading "ae" on the South Korean government's official list of hanja which may be registered for use in given names. One hanja often used to write "ae" (사랑 애 sarang ae), means "love".

People with this name include:
Lee Ji-ae (born 1981), South Korean television announcer
Jeon Ji-ae (born 1984), South Korean actress
Lee Ji-ae (born 1987), South Korean singer, former member of T-ara
Jiyai Shin (born 1988), South Korean golfer
Yoo Ji-ae (born 1993), South Korean singer, member of Lovelyz
Kim Ji-ae (born 1995), South Korean singer, member of Wassup (band)

See also
List of Korean given names

References

Korean feminine given names